The 2002 Taman Hillview landslide occurred on 20 November 2002 in Taman Hillview, Ulu Klang, Selangor, Malaysia, crushing the bungalow of the Affin Bank chairman General (RtD) Tan Sri Ismail Omar and killing eight people. Investigation showed the landslide occurred on an old landslide

See also
 Highland Towers collapse
 2008 Bukit Antarabangsa landslide related events

References

 Is the Ground in Ulu Klang Unstable?

2002 disasters in Malaysia
Taman Hillview landslide
Taman Hillview landslide
Taman Hillview landslide
Taman Hillview landslide
November 2002 events in Asia
Building collapses in Malaysia